Poecilasthena xylocyma is a moth in the family Geometridae. It is found in Australia, where it is known from Western Australia, South Australia and Tasmania.

References

Moths described in 1891
Poecilasthena
Moths of Australia